William Stevenson (June 9, 1923 - December 11, 1992) was a Canadian sprint canoeist who competed from the late 1940s to the late 1950s. Competing in two Summer Olympics, he earned his best finish of fifth in the C-2 10000 m event at London in 1948.

References

1923 births
1992 deaths
Canadian male canoeists
Canoeists at the 1948 Summer Olympics
Canoeists at the 1956 Summer Olympics
Olympic canoeists of Canada